Christophe Naegelen (born 30 December 1983) is a French Independent politician who has represented Vosges's 3rd constituency in the National Assembly since 2017.

In parliament, Naegelen has been serving on the Finance Committee since 2020. He has previously been a member of the Committee on Foreign Affairs (2017-2020) and the Committee on Economic Affairs (2018-2020). In addition to his committee assignments, he was part of the French delegation to the Franco-German Parliamentary Assembly from 2019 until 2020. 

Since 2019, Naegelen has been part of the UDI and Independents group.

References 

1983 births
Living people
21st-century French politicians
Deputies of the 15th National Assembly of the French Fifth Republic
Politicians from Grand Est
Independent politicians in France
People from Remiremont
Deputies of the 16th National Assembly of the French Fifth Republic